The Riff Raff Element is a 1990s British television series written by Debbie Horsfield and directed by Jeremy Ancock for BBC One. The series was nominated for the British Academy Television Award for Best Drama Series in 1994.

Plot
The basic plot was "the Tundishes, down-at-heel country aristocrats, are compelled to live cheek-by-jowl with the vulgar Belchers from Salford" so simultaneously drawing on the English north-south divide and class divide.

Cast
The Belchers
Trevor Peacock — Acky Belcher
Susan Brown — Maggie Belcher
Mossie Smith — Petula Belcher
Jayne Ashbourne — Carmen
Cal MacAninch — Declan

The Tundishes
Ronald Pickup — Roger Tundish
Pippa Guard — Phoenix
Richard Hope — Mortimer Tundish
Celia Imrie — Joanna Tundish
Nicholas Farrell — Boyd Tundish
Greg Wise — Alister
Stewart Pile — Oliver Tundish
Stewart Bewley — Oliver Tundish
Ashley Wright — Nathan Tundish

Others
Lionel Guyett — Father Casper
Dicken Ashworth — Nelson
Kate Binchy — Dearbhla
Brenda Bruce — Granny Grogan
George Costigan — Vincent

References

External links

Plot summaries at BFI, ftvdb.bfi.org.uk; accessed 12 August 2014.

1993 British television series debuts
1994 British television series endings
1990s British comedy-drama television series
BBC television dramas
British comedy-drama television shows
Television shows set in Greater Manchester
English-language television shows